This article is a discography of Eva Cassidy, an American vocalist known for her interpretations of jazz, blues, folk, gospel, country and pop classics.

Albums

Studio albums

Compilation albums

Live albums

Unofficial releases

Singles

Video albums

References

Cassidy, Eva